Comephorus dybowskii, the little Baikal oilfish, is a species of freshwater ray-finned fish belonging to the family Cottidae, the typical sculpins. This fish is endemic to Lake Baikal in Russia.

References

dybowskii
Fish described in 1904
Fish of Lake Baikal